The Hawaiian Humane Society is a nonprofit, open admission animal shelter in Moiliili, Hawaii. Its original mission was to help children and unwed mothers, but in 1935 changed to its current animal focus.

It has a staff of 85 people who care for healthy animals and treat sick animals, investigate complaints, teach classes, and adopt out cats & dogs. They also have a large group volunteers.

History
In 1883, 350 concerned citizens organized the Hawaiian Humane Society, a local non-profit, with its first office on the Iolani Palace grounds in a cottage donated by King Kalākaua.

Helen Wilder, daughter of American shipping magnate Samuel Gardner Wilder, was given the authority to enforce animal cruelty laws in 1897. At that time, she was the first female police officer of the Hawaiian Police Force and perhaps the world. She and her friends raised funds to hire Chang Apana to investigate animal crimes as their first humane investigator.

When the Hawaiian Humane Society was first established, it also served to protect unwed mothers, the mentally ill, and adopted out children.  In 1935 the Society abdicated these child protection functions to government agencies such as Child Protective Services.

In 1942 the organization moved to a building in Moiliili. The facility expanded in 2016.

Programs

The Hawaiian Humane Society's programs and services focus on strengthening the human-animal bond: rescuing the abused, engaging volunteers, fighting for better laws and caring for more than 20,000 animals a year. They are an open-admission shelter with over 30 programs and services that focus on unwanted prevention, spay and neutering, pet ID and responsible pet acquisition.

References

Further reading

External links

Animal shelters in the United States
Animal welfare organizations based in the United States
Organizations established in 1883
Organizations based in Honolulu
1883 establishments in Hawaii
Non-profit organizations based in Hawaii